Matthias Bader (born 17 June 1997) is a German professional footballer who plays as a defender for Darmstadt 98.

References

External links
 

Living people
1997 births
Sportspeople from Pforzheim
German footballers
Germany youth international footballers
Association football defenders
Karlsruher SC players
1. FC Köln players
SV Darmstadt 98 players
2. Bundesliga players
3. Liga players
Footballers from Baden-Württemberg
21st-century German people